Rye Valley is an unincorporated community in Baker County, in the U.S. state of Oregon. It is slightly west of Interstate 84 near Weatherby and Dixie.

The community is named for a native grass used as forage for pack animals important to the region's immigrants and miners in the 1860s. A Rye Valley post office opened on September 27, 1869, and operated intermittently between then and September 14, 1935. Nayson S. Whitcomb was the first postmaster.

On July 24, 2014, a wildfire started by lightning happened in Rye Valley. The lightning first struck on Bureau of Land Management lands; however, winds quickly drove it onto forestlands protected by the Oregon Department of Forestry. The fire took three days to fully contain.

References

Unincorporated communities in Baker County, Oregon
Unincorporated communities in Oregon